Ardross is a suburb of Perth, Western Australia, located within the City of Melville. It was once an area of land acquired by the Scotsman, Sir Alexander Percival Matheson in 1896. In Matheson's subdivision of the adjoining suburb of Applecross, he created "Ardross Street" naming it after either the town of Ardrossan on the Scottish west coast or Ardross Castle, located about 40 kilometers north of Inverness. The suburb derives its name from this street.

Location
Ardross, together with Applecross and Mount Pleasant, is situated on a peninsula jutting into the Swan River. Ardross is roughly bordered by:
the aforementioned Ardross Street to the east
Canning Highway to the north
Wireless Hill Park to the west
Garden City shopping centre to the south

Wireless Hill

Within the suburb's boundaries are the Wireless Hill Museum and lookout, from where river vistas can be viewed. This is the landmark site of the first communications radio in Western Australia and now an oasis for wildflowers and rabbits. The hill was mostly denuded for its original telecommunication purpose and then left to the ravages of weeds. Since 1985, however, extensive replanting of mostly native species has resulted in a diverse collection of 20,000 - 30,000 plants. During late winter and spring, orchids, Geraldton wax, wattles, grevilleas, callistemon and kangaroo paws may be seen.

Photos of the suburb

References

General references

External links

Suburbs of Perth, Western Australia
Suburbs in the City of Melville